William Boyett (January 3, 1927 – December 29, 2004) was an American actor best known for his roles in law enforcement dramas on television from the 1950s through the 1990s.

Early years
Boyett was born in Akron, Ohio, the son of Harry Lee and Margaret D. Boyett.  Harry Lee's parents were Dorsey H. and Carrie Evelyn Flowers, who married in McLennan Co., TX, on July 9, 1899.  Dorsey and Carrie lived in Waco, Ft. Worth and San Antonio, TX.  Boyett often played roles of characters in uniform. His paternal grandfather, Dorsey, participated in the Spanish American War as a corporal in Co. F, 2nd TX Infantry and was also stationed in Laredo, TX, in 1917, in charge of all non-commissioned officers in Co. M, 37th Infantry, while the United States was in conflict with Mexico.

Carrie remarried and in the 1930 U.S. Census, Harry William is enumerated as "Harry" with Carrie, William Cason, and his older brother, Wallace, at 2103 Proctor Avenue in Waco, TX.  Harry William, who was then known as Harry, attended Waco High School, where he was active in theater, the Rostra Literary Society, the Junior Classical League, Boys Chorus, and as a junior was a Texas Interscholastic League contestant in Declamation.  He won a Shakespeare competition in high school, which led to acting jobs in radio. The 1940 U.S. Census shows that although he was living in Los Angeles on April 1, 1935, he had returned to Waco, and he was again living with his grandmother, Carrie, and his step-grandfather, William Cason.  He later permanently moved with his family to Los Angeles, California. 

His father, Harry Lee Boyett, served in WW I in the Navy.  Harry Lee married Margaret on September 4, 1925, in St. Clair Co., Michigan, while working as a rubber worker. On a ship's registry sailing from Havana to New Orleans, in October of 1932, he listed his address as Paramount in Hollywood, CA.  It also reports his birth date is February 15, 1899, and he was born in Waco, TX.  He died at age 36 after having emergency surgery.  He and his mother, Carrie, are buried in Rosemound Cemetery, Waco, TX.

Military service
Boyett served in the Navy during World War II and afterward performed on the stage in both New York City and Los Angeles.

Television
In 1954, Boyett played respected settler Jim Hardwicke in the Death Valley Days episode "11,000 Miners Can't Be Wrong". Boyett was typecast as a law-enforcement officer, most notably as Dan Matthews (Broderick Crawford)'s patrol officer on Highway Patrol, where he appeared in 65 episodes, either as Sgt. Johnson or Sgt. Williams, between 1955 and 1959; Boyett also portrayed a policeman in such diverse series as Gang Busters; The Man Behind the Badge; I Led 3 Lives; M Squad; The Detectives; Sea Hunt;  Bat Masterson; Batman; Gomer Pyle, U.S.M.C.; and Star Trek: The Next Generation.

Jack Webb, the executive producer of Adam-12,  selected Boyett for the role of  Sgt. "Mac"  MacDonald after several performances (such as playing Sgt. Sam Hunter) in both iterations of Webb's Dragnet. (Boyett can also be seen uncredited as a bailiff in the 1954 movie version.)  Boyett appeared as MacDonald on Adam-12 for its entire 1968–1975 run.

He also made eight guest appearances on CBS's Perry Mason throughout the series' nine-year run, mostly in law-enforcement roles. In 1962, he played slain police officer Otto Norden in "The Case of the Hateful Hero". The defendant was his rookie partner James Anderson played by Richard Davalos, cousin of series regular Lt. Anderson played by Wesley Lau. He also played a corporate executive, Buck Osborn, in the 1961 episode "The Case of the Renegade Refugee". In the 1961 My Three Sons episode "Fire Watch", he was a forest ranger.

Boyett appeared in a number of television programs, such as Official Detective, Navy Log, Laramie, Tales of the Texas Rangers, I Spy, The Man from U.N.C.L.E. (uncredited; "The Secret Sceptre Affair" from 1965), The Andy Griffith Show, Family Affair, Fantasy Island,  The Love Boat, The Rockford Files, The A-Team, Gunsmoke, Knight Rider, Space Patrol, Rescue 8, Whirlybirds, Ripcord, Murphy Brown and Night Court. He also appeared in numerous episodes of Emergency! as Chief McConnikee of Los Angeles County Fire Department's Battalion 14.
Boyett also occasionally appeared in television commercials.

Film
Boyett also acted in several motion pictures, such as The Hidden (1987) and The Rocketeer (1991). Boyett earned much praise for his highly unusual role in The Hidden as a hospital patient named Jonathan P. Miller, possessed by an alien being with a taste for red Ferraris and rock and roll music. He also appeared in a well-known short public safety film entitled Last Clear Chance (1959) as Patrolman Hal Jackson. Interest in the film was renewed by its appearance in a 1993 episode of Mystery Science Theater 3000. Boyett's other small roles as a police officer include the crime dramas Vice Squad (1953) with Edward G. Robinson and Shield For Murder (1954) with Edmond O'Brien.

Death
Boyett died December 29, 2004, in Mission Hills, California, five days before his 78th birthday, from pneumonia and kidney failure.

Filmography

 Street Bandits (1951) as Detective (uncredited)
 Without Warning! (1952) as Cop Hit by Martin (uncredited)
 Torpedo Alley (1952) as Submariner (uncredited)
 By the Light of the Silvery Moon (1953) as Miss LaRue's Associate (uncredited)
 So This Is Love (1953) as George Gershwin (uncredited)
 Vice Squad (1953) as Officer Kellogg (uncredited)
 Return from the Sea (1954) as Sailor (uncredited)
 Dragnet (1954) as Grand Jury Bailiff (uncredited)
 Shield for Murder (1954) as Policeman Cooper (uncredited)
 Private Hell 36 (1955) as Mr. Stinson (uncredited)
 Big House, U.S.A. (1955) as Ranger at Park Exit (uncredited)
 Strange Lady in Town (1955) as Lt. Keith (uncredited)
 Running Wild (1955) as Minor Role (uncredited)
 Inside Detroit (1956) as Blair U.A.W. Friend (uncredited)
 Forbidden Planet (1956) as Crewman (uncredited)
 Somebody Up There Likes Me (1956) as Military Policeman Escort at Fight (uncredited)
 Francis in the Haunted House (1956) as Kissing Man (uncredited)
 Behind the High Wall (1956) as Policeman (uncredited)
 Beyond a Reasonable Doubt (1956) as Staff (uncredited)
 Fighting Trouble (1956) as Chips Conroy (uncredited)
 Emergency Hospital (1956) as Mike - Traffic Officer (uncredited)
 Until They Sail (1957) as U.S. Marine (uncredited)
 Young and Dangerous (1957) as Pier Cop (uncredited)
 Big-Foot Wallace (1957, TV Movie) as First Prisoner
 The Lady Takes a Flyer (1958) as Flight Mechanic (uncredited)
 As Young as We Are (1958) as Eric (uncredited)
 Tarawa Beachhead (1958) as Ullman (uncredited)
 The Clear Last Chance (1959 Safety Film) as Officer Hal Jackson
 It Started with a Kiss (1959) as Alec (uncredited)
 Who Was That Lady? (1960) as Howard (uncredited)
 My Three Sons (6/08/1961) as Joe Mitchell
 Sea Hunt (1958-1960, TV Series) as Policeman / Asst. DA / Police Lieutenant / Paul Garrick / Spy / Saboteur / Mr. Hanson / Eddie Mahar / Newscast / Delmar
 Sam Whiskey (1969) as Corporal
 Airport (1970) as Jack Ingram
 That Girl, The Mail Man Cometh (Season 2, Episode 12, 11/30/1967, TV Series) as photographer
 Vanished (1971, TV Mini-Series) as Cmdr. Prescott
 Mobile Two (1975, TV Movie) as Lt. Don Carter
 Gemini Man (1976, TV Mini-Series) as 1st Officer
 Emergency! (1976-1978, TV Series) as Chief McConnike, Battalion 14 / Battalion Chief #14 / Captain, Station #39
 Washington: Behind Closed Doors (1977, TV Mini-Series) as Hard Hat
 Confessions of the D.A. Man (1978, TV Movie)
 Every Girl Should Have One (1978) as Detective Rand
 Ike: The War Years (1979, TV Mini-Series) as Gen. Ward Hoffenberg
 When a Stranger Calls (1979) as Sgt. Sacher
 The Golden Gate Murders (1979, TV Movie) as Bridge Supervisor
 Gypsy Angels (1981) as Mr. Allman
 Bloody Birthday (1981)
 Space Raiders (1983) as Taggert
 The Christmas Tree Train (1983, TV Movie) as Ranger Jones (voice)
 Getting Physical (1984, TV Movie) as Desk Sergeant
 Sam's Son (1984) as Coach Sutter
 Which Witch Is Which (1984, TV Movie) as Ranger Jones (voice)
 The Turkey Caper (1985, TV Movie) as Ranger Jones (voice)
 The Deliberate Stranger (1986, TV Movie) as Aspen Detective
 Native Son (1986) as Reporter #3
The Young and the Restless (1986) as Walter Edmonson
 The Hidden (1987) as Jonathan P. Miller
 The Adventure Machine (1990, TV Movie) as Ranger Jones (uncredited)
 The Rocketeer (1991) as Government Liaison
 Strays (1991, TV Movie) as Dr. Lyle Sokol
 The Wish That Changed Christmas (1991, TV Movie) as Ranger Jones (voice)
 Newsies (1992) as Judge Movealong Monahan
 Girls in Prison (1994, TV Movie) as Dr. Shainmark
 Blood Run (1994, TV Movie) as Briskin
 Theodore Rex (1995) as Desk Sergeant

Selected Television

\

References

Further reading
 Associated Press (January 3, 2005).  Actor William Boyett, 77, Akron native, dies in L.A. Akron Beacon Journal, p. B6.

External links
 
 

1927 births
2004 deaths
Male actors from Akron, Ohio
American male film actors
American male television actors
Deaths from kidney failure
Deaths from pneumonia in California
Male actors from New York City
Male actors from Los Angeles
20th-century American male actors